Kaarlo Halttunen (18 August 1909 – 8 March 1986) was a Finnish actor. He appeared in 87 films and television shows between 1933 and 1970. He starred in the film Yksityisalue, which was entered into the 13th Berlin International Film Festival.

Selected filmography
 Radio tekee murron (1951)
 Radio tulee hulluksi (1952)
 After the Fall of Man (1953)
 The Unknown Soldier (1955)
 1918 (1957)
 Little Presents (1961)
 Yksityisalue (1962)

References

External links

1909 births
1986 deaths
People from Lappeenranta
People from Viipuri Province (Grand Duchy of Finland)
Finnish male film actors
20th-century Finnish male actors